The Ferrari 360 (Type F131) is a two-seater, mid-engine, rear wheel drive sports car manufactured by Italian automotive manufacturer Ferrari from 1999 until 2005. It succeeded the Ferrari F355 and was replaced by the Ferrari F430 in 2004.

Development history 
Ferrari partnered with Alcoa to produce an entirely new all-aluminium space-frame chassis that was 40% stiffer than its predecessor's which had utilized steel. The design was 28% lighter despite a 10% increase in overall dimensions. Along with a lightweight frame the new Pininfarina body styling deviated from traditions of the previous decade's sharp angles and flip-up headlights. The new V8 engine utilises a 3.6-litre capacity, a flat-plane crankshaft, and titanium connecting rods.

The first model to be produced was the 360 Modena, followed later by the 360 Spider and a special edition, the Challenge Stradale. The Challenge Stradale was the high-performance road-legal version of the 360 produced by the factory, featuring carbon ceramic brakes (from the Enzo), track-tuned suspension, aerodynamic gains, weight reduction, power improvements and revised gearbox software among its track-focused brief. There were 8,800 Modenas and 7,565 Spiders produced worldwide. There were 4,199 built for the US market—1,810 Modenas (coupes) and 2,389 Spiders (convertibles). Of those numbers, there were only 469 Modenas and 670 Spiders that were produced with a gated 6-speed manual transmission as opposed to the "F1" single-clutch automated manual transmission.

In addition to this were the low-volume factory race cars and a one-off Barchetta variant. The race cars were all derived from the 360 Modena and for the first time produced as a separate model in their own right (compared to being a retrofit kit in previous years). While the Barchetta was based on the Spider variant. The first race car was the 360 Modena Challenge, used in a one-make series; the factory-built racing cars were prepared by the official tuner, Michelotto, who also developed the 360 N-GT. The N-GT was a 360 Challenge car evolved even further to compete in the FIA N-GT racing class alongside other marques such as Porsche.

Road models

Modena

The first model of the 360 to be produced was the Modena, named after the town of Modena, the birthplace of Enzo Ferrari. Transmission choice ranges from 6-speed  manual transmission, or the electrohydraulic-actuated "F1" automated manual transmission with a gearbox built by Graziano Trasmissioni. 

The 360 Modena went into production in 1999 and remained in production until 2005 when it was replaced by the F430. The Modena was followed two years later by the 360 Spider, Ferrari's 20th road-going convertible which at launch overtook sales of the Modena. Other than weight, the Spider's specifications matched those of the Modena almost exactly.

Spider

The Ferrari 360 Spider was unveiled at the 2000 Geneva Motor Show.

The 360 was designed with a convertible variant in mind; since removing the roof of a coupe reduces the torsional rigidity, the 360 was built for strength in other areas. Ferrari designers strengthened the sills, stiffened the front of the floorpan and redesigned the windscreen frame. The rear bulkhead had to be stiffened to cut out engine noise from the cabin. The convertible's necessary dynamic rigidity is provided by additional side reinforcements and a cross brace in front of the engine. Passenger safety is ensured by a strengthened windscreen frame and roll bars.

The 360 Spider displays a curvilinear waistline. The fairings imply the start of a roof, and stable roll bars are embedded in these elevations. Due to use of light aluminium construction throughout, the Spider weighs in only  heavier than the coupé.

The engine — confined in space by the convertible's top's storage area — acquires additional air supply through especially large side air intakes. The intake manifolds were moved towards the centre of the engine between the air supply conduits in the Spider's engine compartment, as opposed to lying apart as with the Modena. In terms of performance, the 0- acceleration time was slightly slower due to the slight weight increase, and the top speed was reduced.

Despite the car's mid-mounted V8 engine, the electrically operated top is able to stow into the compartment when not in use. The convertible top was available in black, blue, grey and beige colours.

Dimensions
 Overall: length 
 Overall: width 
 Height: 
 Wheelbase: 
 Front track: 
 Rear track: 
 Weight: 
 Curb weight:  
 Weight distribution: 42/58% front/rear
 Fuel capacity:

Specifications (Modena and Spider)

Engine

 Type: 90° V8 F1310-00
 Bore & stroke: 
 Total displacement: 
 Redline: 8,700 rpm
 Maximum power:  at 8,500 rpm
 Maximum torque:  at 4,750 rpm

Performance
 Top speed: Redline limited -  / Manufacturer claim - 
 Lift-to-drag ratio: -0.73:1
 Acceleration:
 0-: 2.47 seconds
 0-: 4.6 seconds
 0-: 4.98 seconds
 0-: 6.79 seconds
 0-: 11.1 seconds / 11.7 seconds
 0-: 21.9 seconds
 Standing : 13.1–13.2 seconds at 
 Standing kilometer: 23.74 seconds
 Braking: -0 mph:  
 Lateral acceleration: 0.90 g
 Speed through  slalom: 
 EPA fuel economy:
 City: 
 High way: 
 Combined: 
 Est. range:
 City: 
 High way:

Barchetta

The Ferrari 360 Barchetta (serial number 120020)  is a one-off based on the Ferrari 360 Spider which was commissioned by Gianni Agnelli in 2000 as a wedding present for the then Fiat chairman and president of Ferrari, Luca Cordero di Montezemolo. The car bears heavy resemblance to its donor with the only differences being the removal of the soft top system and roll bars, different engine cover and the addition of a visor in place of a windshield for better airflow over the car. Performance of the car remains the same as its donor and the car features Argento Nurburgring exterior paint with red pinstriping. The interior is black leather with cream fabric and features fabric seats with matching stitching, the words 360 Barchetta embroidered on the dashboard and a paddle-shift gearbox.

Challenge Stradale

Inspired by the 360 Modena Challenge racing car series, the Challenge Stradale is the  track-focused iteration of the 360 Modena. The focus in development of the car was primarily on improving its track performance credentials by concentrating on handling, braking and weight reduction characteristics, which are essential in pure racing cars. Ferrari engineers designed the car from the outset with a goal of 20% track day use in mind and 80% road use. Systematic improvements were achieved to the setup and feel of the whole car; throttle response from the digital throttle was ratcheted up and feedback through the steering wheel was enhanced. Ceramic brakes borrowed from the Enzo, some lower weight parts and a FHP handling pack, enabled the Challenge Stradale to claim a 3.5 second improvement per lap of its Fiorano Circuit compared to the Modena.

In total, the Challenge Stradale is up to  lighter than the standard Modena if all the lightweight options are specified such as deleted radio, lexan (plexiglass) door windows and Alcantara fabric (instead of the leather option). Resin Transfer Moulding was utilised for the bumpers and skirts, a carry over from the Challenge cars which resulted in lighter bumpers than those on the Modena. The engine and transmission weight was lightened by  through the use of a smaller, lighter weight sports exhaust back box and valved exit pipes.

Dimensions
 Overall length: 
 Overall width: 
 Height: 
 Wheelbase: 
 Front track: 
 Rear track: 
 Dry weight: 
 Curb weight: 
 Fuel capacity:

Engine
 Type: Naturally aspirated 90° V8 engine F131
 Position: Longitudinally-mounted Rear mid-engine, rear-wheel-drive layout
 Valvetrain: DOHC 5 valves per cylinder
 Fuel feed: Bosch Motronic 7.3 fuel injection
 Bore X stroke: 
 Total displacement: 
 Redline: 8,650 rpm
 Compression ratio: 11.2:1
 Max. power:  at 8,500 rpm
 Max. torque:  at  4,750 rpm

Performance
 0-: 4.0 seconds 
 Top speed: Redline limited - 
 Lift to drag: about -1.1:1

Race models

360 Challenge

Based on the 360 Modena road car, the 360 Challenge was an extensively reworked, track-oriented model intended to compete in Ferrari's one-make racing series called the Ferrari Challenge.
It was only available with the electrohydraulic-actuated automated manual transmission. Brembo racing provided the upgraded Gold coloured calipers and larger floating 2-piece discs, while Bosch provided the race-oriented ABS software. The exhaust system was lightened substantially and was one of the main contributions to the increased power output over the standard engine (as ignition mapping was claimed to virtually be the same). For the road cars (even the Challenge Stradale) Ferrari used a valve system that made the car more socially acceptable at lower revs (and therefore able to pass drive-by noise tests).

Less than 200 were made and marketed by Ferrari as a pure race car, requiring purchasers to enter their Ferrari 360 Challenge into the Ferrari Challenge race series as a condition of sale.

Unlike the previous Challenge race series, which utilised an F355 road car with a dealer-installed 'challenge upgrade' kit, the 360 Challenge was a factory-built track car. The enhanced driving characteristics and substantial weight reduction meant the car could comfortably outperform its road-going counterpart even though power from the 3.6-litre engine was claimed to be similar.

The 360 Challenge featured a stripped-down race-oriented interior with the stereo, electric windows and locks, soundproofing, airbags, air-conditioning, and even the handbrake removed. The seats and restraints were replaced by a single carbon-fibre racing seat and FIA approved restraint harnesses, and a roll cage was fitted for safety along with a fire suppression system. The instrument cluster was reworked with a monochrome LCD to display vital engine data. The adaptive suspension of the road car was replaced by adjustable racing dampers, while larger brakes with extra cooling ducts were added.

Official performance figures
 Power (SAE net):  at 8,500 rpm
 Torque (SAE net):  at 4,750 rpm
 0–100 km/h (0–62 mph): 3.9 seconds
 Top speed (limited): 
 Kerb Weight: 
 Dry Weight:

360 N-GT
 
The Ferrari 360 N-GT was a 360 Challenge race car tuned by Michellotto for the N-GT category of the FIA GT Championship. It was the fastest version of the Ferrari 360 with the engine generating a power output of over  when derestricted. It was the final car built through a Ferrari-Michelotto collaboration. The car is still raced internationally with success to this day. The most recent major victory achieved by a 360 Michelotto was by SB Race Engineering at the 2011 Britcar Championship, where the 360 N-GT, as on many occasions, outperformed the newer F430 GT.

In 2002, a 360 N-GT was driven in the Australian Nations Cup Championship for GT style cars. Run by Prancing Horse Racing to replace the teams 360 Challenge and driven by highly successful Australian race driver John Bowe, the car would eventually place 3rd in the 2002 championship. PHR then entered the Ferrari in the 2002 Bathurst 24 Hour race at the famous Mount Panorama Circuit, where Brad Jones put the 360 N-GT on pole position. After running in 2nd place behind the 7.0-litre Holden Monaro 427C which would go on to win the race outright, the 360 N-GT lost its oil pressure. PHR then did an engine change in just 3 hours, only to have the replacement engine also lose oil pressure just under 3 hours later ending their race. Bowe then finished 2nd in the 2003 Nations Cup Championship before the car was raced one last time in the 2003 Bathurst 24 Hour, where it was run by Austrian-based team BE Racing. Driven by David Brabham, Andrea Montermini, Klaus Engelhorn and Philipp Peter, the Ferrari qualified in 7th place and after running 3rd for a number of hours behind the Holden Monaros, was retired on lap 287.

360 GT

The Ferrari 360 GT is a race version of the 360 Modena developed by the Ferrari Corse Clienti department in Maranello, in collaboration with Michelotto Automobili to compete in the FIA N-GT class.
Team JMB Giesse raced the cars during the 2001 FIA GT Championship season and won the N-GT Cup for Drivers and the N-GT Cup for Teams.

From 2002 to 2004, Ferrari produced and sold 20 360 GTs to customers through their Corse Clienti department.

Significant additional weight reduction efforts were taken over the regular 360 Challenge cars such as lightening the wiring loom (saving 7 kg alone) as well as removing all unnecessary weight like air-conditioning brackets and doors which were now made from one-piece of carbon fibre along with the front compartment lid.

360 GTC

The Ferrari 360 GTC has been developed to replace the previous 360 GT. It made use of recent evolutions successfully race tested on the Ferrari 360 GT, with a sequential six-speed gearbox and a further improved Magneti Marelli electronics package. The aerodynamics are substantially different from the 360 GT, given that the 360 GTC had been newly homologated by FIA/ACO from the Challenge Stradale, taking up from its basic elements: front bumper, side skirts, engine cover and double rear end. Wind tunnel research has led to a new system for the rear wing, with a notable improvement in vertical downforce. The performance of the  90-degree V8 engine has been improved in terms of fuel consumption.

In 2009, a privately owned Veloqx-Prodrive Racing 360 raced de-restricted, fully tuned variations of the GT-C in endurance races around the world including Silverstone, Sebring and Le-Mans.

Specifications
 Country of origin: Italy
 Introduced at: 2003 Bologna Motor Show
 Body design: Pininfarina
 Weight: 
 Engine: F131 90° V8
 Engine Location: Mid, longitudinally mounted
 Displacement: 
 Valvetrain: five valves / cylinder, DOHC
 Fuel feed: Magneti Marelli MR3 Fuel injection
 Aspiration: naturally aspirated
 Gearbox: six-speed sequential
 Drive: rear wheel drive

Performance
 Power:  at 8,750 rpm [ unrestricted]
 Torque:  at 6,500 rpm
 Power to displacement ratio: 131 hp/L (97 kW/L)
 Power-to-weight ratio: 472 hp/tonne (352 kW/tonne)
 Top speed: Over 320 km/h (200 mph)
 0 to 100 km/h (62 mph): 4.2 seconds

Reviews 
While performance claims for the 360 were equal to or higher than the previous model, when Car and Driver tested a stock 360 it proved heavier and slower than its predecessor's claimed performance from five years before.

References

External links

360
Sports cars
Rear mid-engine, rear-wheel-drive vehicles
2000s cars
Cars introduced in 1999